Adelheid Wagner or Adelaïde Salles-Wagner (1825–1890) was a German painter active in France.She was a pupil of Claude Jacquand in Lyon, and Joseph Bernhardt in Munich or Paris.

She married the painter Jules Salles from Nîmes.

She is known for portraits and genre works of children. Her work Breton Girl Praying was included in the book Women Painters of the World.Her sister Elise Puyroche-Wagner also became a painter.

References

1825 births
1890 deaths
German women painters
French women painters
19th-century German painters
19th-century French painters
19th-century French women artists
Artists from Dresden
German emigrants to France